Jökulsá (literally glacier river) is the name of several rivers in Iceland.
 Jökulsá á Dal, also known as Jökulsá á Brú or Jökla
 Jökulsá á Fjöllum, the second longest river in Iceland
 Jökulsá á Breiðamerkursandi
 , which becomes Lagarfljót

 Jökulsá í Borgarfirði eystri, a river
Jökulsá í Fáskrúðsfirði, a small river
Jökulsá á Flateyjardal, a small river

See also
List of rivers of Iceland 
Austari-Jökulsá